Skei or Surnadal is the administrative center of Surnadal Municipality in Møre og Romsdal county, Norway. The village is located at near the end of the Surnadalsfjorden along the river Surna. There are two churches near Skei:  Øye Church (north of Skei) and Ranes Church (east of Skei).

Skei is combined with the neighboring village of Surnadalsøra as an "urban area" by Statistics Norway.

References

Surnadal
Villages in Møre og Romsdal